The 2013 Pacific Rugby League International was created in advance of the international 2013 Rugby League World Cup campaigns played between Samoa and Tonga. Tonga won the test match 36–4. Tonga's Samisoni Langi won the player of the match award, scoring 16 points from two attempts and four conversions.

Controversy occurred late in the match, as the game was ended before Langi had the chance to convert the final try because fans invaded the pitch.

Both teams selected new players, with the most experienced players appearing between 3-8 times. The most experienced players in the test match were Tonga's Richard Fa'aoso and Etu Uaisele who both made 8 previous appearances. Samoa's most experienced player was Ben Roberts who made 3 previous appearances. All players were contracted to NRL clubs (though some were still playing in the NYC, except for Tongan winger Etu Uaisele who played for the Wyong Roos in the New South Wales Cup.

Also that weekend was the ANZAC test.

Match details

ANZAC test

The 2013 ANZAC test (also known as the VB Test due to sponsorship by Victoria Bitter) was the 14th annual Anzac test, and was the first time the Australian Kangaroos played at Canberra Stadium and in the Australia's capital city. They defeated New Zealand 32-12 in the test match played on 19 April 2013 before a crowd of 25,628.

Polynesian Cup

October matches

Pacific nations participated in four matches before the 2013 Rugby League World Cup in Europe. Scotland played Papua New Guinea at Featherstone, New Zealand played the Cook Islands in Doncaster and England A played Samoa at Salford.

References

See also
 2013 Anzac Test

Pacific Rugby League International
Rugby league in Sydney
2013 in Tongan sport
2013 in Samoan sport